The lawn bowls competition at the 1970 British Commonwealth Games took place in Edinburgh, Scotland from 16–25 July 1970. Lawn bowls returned to the Commonwealth Games following the exclusion of the event in the 1966 British Empire and Commonwealth Games because Jamaica had insufficient bowling greens.

Medal table

Medallists

Results

Men's singles – round robin

Men's pairs – round robin

Men's rinks (fours) – round robin

References

See also
List of Commonwealth Games medallists in lawn bowls
Lawn bowls at the Commonwealth Games

Lawn bowls at the Commonwealth Games
Brit